Shoes is the debut album by Kelly. It features electroclash backbeats and comedic lyrics. It was released on June 21, 2006. Six of the songs—the first six tracks—were made into music videos; however, only four were released as actual singles. In June 2009, it became available for purchase on CD at Amazon.com. It is also available as a ringtone album.

Only the first seven tracks are original songs; the rest are remixes, alternate versions or radio edits (which remove profanity). The "Canadian edit" of "What R U Guys Talking About?" is identical to the original track, but contains a stereotypical Canadian accent pronunciation of "about".

Track listing
 "Shoes" – 2:47
 "Let Me Borrow That Top" – 2:23
 "Txt Msg Brkup" – 3:51
 "Where Do You Think You're Going in That?" (Kelly's Mom) – 3:41
 "No Booty Calls" – 4:24
 "What R U Guys Talking About?" – 2:16
 "My Romantic Pattern" – 5:08
 "Shoes Remix" – 3:07
 "Let Me Borrow That Top Remix" – 2:40
 "What R U Guys Talking About?" (Canadian edit) – 2:16
 "Where Do You Think You're Going in That?" (Revisited) – 3:07
 "Shoes" (radio edit)* – 2:48
 "Let Me Borrow That Top" (radio edit)* – 2:22

 * iTunes and Amazon.com bonus tracks.

External links

2006 debut albums
Liam Kyle Sullivan albums
2000s comedy albums